Patton's Speech to the Third Army was a series of speeches given by General George S. Patton to troops of the United States Third Army in 1944, prior to the Allied invasion of France. The speeches were intended to motivate the inexperienced Third Army for its pending combat duty. In the speeches, Patton urged his soldiers to do their duty regardless of personal fear, and he exhorted them to aggressiveness and constant offensive action. Patton's profanity-laced speaking was viewed as unprofessional by some other officers but the speech resounded well with his men. Some historians have acclaimed the oration as one of the greatest motivational speeches of all time.

A shorter and less profane version of the speech became well known after it appeared in the 1970 movie Patton, given by George C. Scott as Patton while standing before an enormous American flag. Scott's performance was instrumental in bringing Patton into popular culture and transforming him into a folk hero.

Background 
In June 1944, Lieutenant General George S. Patton was given command of the Third United States Army, a field army which was newly arrived in the United Kingdom and which was composed largely of inexperienced troops. Patton's job had been to train the Third Army to prepare it for the upcoming Allied invasion of France, where it would join in the Operation Cobra breakout into Brittany seven weeks after  the Operation Overlord amphibious invasion at Normandy.

By 1944, Patton had been established as a highly effective and successful leader, noted for his ability to inspire his men with charismatic speeches, which he delivered from memory because of a lifelong trouble with reading. Patton deliberately cultivated a flashy, distinctive image in the belief that this would inspire his troops. He carried a trademark ivory-handled Smith & Wesson Model 27 .357 Magnum. He was usually seen wearing a highly polished helmet, riding pants, and high cavalry boots. His jeep bore oversized rank placards on the front and back, as well as a klaxon horn which would loudly announce his approach from afar. Patton was an effective combat commander, having rehabilitated the U.S. II Corps during the North African Campaign and then led the Seventh United States Army through the Invasion of Sicily during 1943, at times personally appearing to his troops in the middle of battle in hopes of inspiring them. Patton's army had beaten British general Bernard Law Montgomery to Messina which gained him considerable fame, although the infamous  "slapping incident" sidelined his career for several months thereafter.

At the time of the speeches, Patton was attempting to keep a low profile among the press, as he had been ordered to by General Dwight Eisenhower. Patton was made a central figure in an elaborate phantom army deception scheme, and the Germans believed he was in Dover preparing the (fictitious) First United States Army Group for an invasion of the Pas de Calais. On each occasion, he would wear his polished helmet, full dress uniform, and gleaming riding boots, and carry a riding crop to snap for effect. Patton frequently kept his face in a scowl he referred to as his "war face". He would arrive in a Mercedes and deliver his remarks on a raised platform surrounded by a very large audience seated around the platform and on surrounding hills. Each address was delivered to a major general-led division-sized force of 15,000 or more men.

Delivery and style 
Patton began delivering speeches to his troops in the United Kingdom in February 1944. The extent of his giving the particular speech that became famous is unclear, with different sources saying it had taken this form by March, or around early May, or in late May. The number of speeches given is also not clear, with one source saying four to six, and others suggesting that every unit in the Third Army heard an instance. The most famous and well known of the speeches occurred on 5 June 1944, the day before D-Day. Though he was unaware of the actual date for the beginning of the invasion of Europe (as the Third Army was not part of the initial landing force), Patton used the speech as a motivational device to excite the men under his command and prevent them from losing their nerve. Patton delivered the speech without notes, and so though it was substantially the same at each occurrence, the order of some of its parts varied. One notable difference occurred in the speech he delivered on 31 May 1944, while addressing the U.S. 6th Armored Division, when he began with a remark that would later be among his most famous:

Patton's words were later written down by a number of troops who witnessed his remarks, and so a number of iterations exist with differences in wording. Historian Terry Brighton constructed a full speech from a number of soldiers who recounted the speech in their memoirs, including Gilbert R. Cook, Hobart R. Gay, and a number of other junior soldiers. Patton only wrote briefly of his orations in his diary, noting, "as in all of my talks, I stressed fighting and killing." The speech later became so popular that it was called simply "Patton's speech" or "The speech" when referencing the general.

The speech

Impact 
The troops under Patton's command received the speech well. The general's strong reputation caused considerable excitement among his men, and they listened intently, in absolute silence, as he spoke. A majority indicated they enjoyed Patton's speaking style. As one officer recounted of the end of the speech, "The men instinctively sensed the fact and the telling mark that they themselves would play in world history because of it, for they were being told as much right now. Deep sincerity and seriousness lay behind the General's colorful words, and the men well knew it, but they loved the way he put it as only he could do it."

A notable minority of Patton's officers were unimpressed or displeased with their commander's use of obscenities, viewing it as unprofessional conduct for a military officer. Among some officers' later recounting of the speech, bullshit would be replaced by baloney and fucking by fornicating. At least one account replaced "We're going to hold the enemy by the balls" with "We're going to hold the enemy by the nose." Among the critics of Patton's frequent use of vulgarities was General Omar Bradley, Patton's former subordinate. It was well known that the two men were polar opposites in personality, and there is evidence that Bradley disliked Patton both personally and professionally. In response to criticisms of his coarse language, Patton wrote to a family member, "When I want my men to remember something important, to really make it stick, I give it to them double dirty. It may not sound nice to a bunch of little old ladies, at an afternoon tea party, but it helps my soldiers to remember. You can't run an army without profanity, and it has to be eloquent profanity. An army without profanity couldn't fight its way out of a piss-soaked paper bag."

Under Patton, the Third Army landed in Normandy during July 1944 and would go on to play an integral role in the last months of the war in Europe, closing the Falaise Pocket in mid-August, and playing the key role in relieving the siege of Bastogne during the Battle of the Bulge in December, a feat regarded as one of the most notable achievements in the war. The rapid offensive action and speed that Patton called for in the speech became actions which brought the Third Army wide acclaim in the campaign.

Historians acclaim the speech as one of Patton's best works. Author Terry Brighton called it "the greatest motivational speech of the war and perhaps of all time, exceeding (in its morale boosting effect if not as literature) the words Shakespeare gave King Henry V at Agincourt." Alan Axelrod contended it was the most famous of his many memorable quotes.

The speech became an icon of popular culture after the 1970 film Patton, which was about the general's wartime exploits. The opening of the movie saw actor George C. Scott, as Patton, delivering a toned-down version of the speech before an enormous American flag.  It began with a version of Patton's "No bastard ever won a war by dying for his country ..." quote. Scott's iteration omitted much of the middle of the speech relating to Patton's anecdotes about Sicily and Libya, as well as his remarks about the importance of every soldier to the war effort. In contrast to Patton's humorous approach, Scott delivered the speech in an entirely serious, low and gruff tone. Still, Scott's depiction of Patton in this scene is an iconic depiction of the General which earned Scott an Academy Award for Best Actor, and was instrumental in bringing Patton into popular culture as a folk hero.

References

Notes

Sources 

 
 
 
 
 
 

World War II speeches
1944 in England
George S. Patton
1944 speeches